Crossosoma bigelovii, known by the common name ragged rockflower, is one of only a few species in the flowering plant family Crossosomataceae.

It is native to the Mojave, Chihuahuan, and Sonoran Deserts of North America. It has been reported from the states of Arizona, California, Nevada, Baja California, Chihuahua, and Sonora.

Description
It is intricately divided into thorn-tipped branches lined with clusters of small, deciduous, gray-green leaves no longer than about 1.5 centimeters. The inflorescence bears a single flower, which has 5 white to purple-tinged petals about a centimeter long and narrowing to claws at their bases.

Uses
Ragged rockflower is occasionally used as an ornamental plant in habitat gardens and natural landscaping.  It can be grown from seed in well-drained soil for a desert butterfly garden.  It is a difficult plant for the average homeowner to grow, as over-watering will kill it.

References

External links
Jepson Manual Treatment
Photo gallery
Lady Bird Johnson Wildflower Research Center

Crossosomataceae
Flora of California
Flora of Arizona
Flora of Nevada
North American desert flora
Flora of the California desert regions
Flora of the Sonoran Deserts
Natural history of the Mojave Desert
~
Garden plants of North America
Drought-tolerant plants
Butterfly food plants
Flora of Baja California
Flora of Chihuahua (state)
Flora of Sonora
Flora without expected TNC conservation status